Apache: The Life of Carlos Tevez is an eight-part 2019 Argentine television series starring Balthazar Murillo, Sofía Gala and Vanesa González. The plot revolves around Carlos Tevez's rise as a football player amid the conditions in Argentina's Ejército de Los Andes, better known as Fuerte Apache.

It was released on August 16, 2019 on Netflix.

Cast
 Balthazar Murillo as Carlos Tévez
 Vanesa González as Adriana Martínez
 Sofía Gala as Fabiana Martínez
 Alberto Ajaka as Segundo Tévez
  as Ramón Madonni
 Matías Recalt as Danilo Sánchez
 Gregorio Barrios as Hernán
 Fernando Contiagiani García as Jorge
 Osqui Guzmán as Chito
 Diego Gallardo as Tiví
 Julián Larquier Tellarini as Cochi
 Tamara Ayelén Arias as China
 Yesica Gilkmán as Anabella
 Patricio Contreras as Chacho
 Roberto Vallejos as Hugo
 Fiona Pereira as Mariela
 Juan Pablo Burgos as Kiru
 Mariela Acosta as Pascuala
 Juan Ignacio Cané as Professor Liniers
 Nicolás Gentile as Sebastián
 Pablo García Plandolit as El Tranza (Cachucha)

Release
Apache: The Life of Carlos Tevez is scheduled to be released on August 16, 2019 on Netflix streaming.

References

External links
 

2019 Argentine television series debuts
Spanish-language Netflix original programming
2010s Argentine drama television series